The First National Building is a skyscraper and class-A office center in Downtown Detroit, Michigan, within the Detroit Financial District. The building is located across the streets from Cadillac Tower and One Detroit Center, and stands next to the Vinton Building.

Description
Built between 1921 and 1930, the building rises 26 stories and includes two basement levels, occupying an entire block along Cadillac Square (adjacent to Campus Martius Park). It is 341 feet (104 m) tall. The structure has an unusual "Z" shape, designed so that most offices would have natural light and ventilation.

The building, designed by Albert Kahn in the Neoclassical architectural style, was constructed primarily with limestone. Three-story Corinthian columns surround the building at the second floor. The space behind the columns originally housed the main banking hall; however, this space was divided for offices during a renovation. The building also houses a parking garage in the South East tower, which is accessible from Bates Street. The original cornice was removed in the late 1970s, and the parapet of the building covered with corrugated aluminum.

The first floor of the building houses retail space, while the upper floors were designed as commercial offices.  Rock Ventures is a major tenant in the building's commercial offices, with Amrock being a primary tenant on most floors.

Gallery

See also
 List of tallest buildings in Detroit

References

Further reading

External links
First National Building official site
First National Building at Emporis.com

Bank buildings in Michigan
Skyscraper office buildings in Detroit
Downtown Detroit
Woodward Avenue
Office buildings completed in 1930
Office buildings on the National Register of Historic Places in Michigan
National Register of Historic Places in Detroit
Historic district contributing properties in Michigan
Rock Ventures
1930 establishments in Michigan
Albert Kahn (architect) buildings